Donald F. Reed (April 29, 1920 – April 9, 2012) was the second head coach for the Long Beach State 49ers football program. He coached from 1958 to 1968 and compiled an overall record of 57–47–2. He also coached the golf team from 1975 to 1980.

Head coaching record

References

1920 births
2012 deaths
Long Beach State 49ers football coaches
College golf coaches in the United States